In general, an imaginary line is usually any sort of geometric line (more generally, curves) that has only an abstract definition and does not physically exist. In fact, they are used to properly identify places on a map.

Some outside geography do exist, such as the Mendoza Line, which in baseball divides below-average hitters and extremely poor hitters. A centerline is a nautical term for a line down the center of a vessel lengthwise.

Examples

Geography 
As a geographical concept, an imaginary line may serve as an arbitrary division, such as
 Antarctic Circle,
 Arctic Circle,
 Border,
 International Date Line,
 Latitude, including the Equator,
 Longitude, the Prime Meridian, the Tropic of Capricorn and the Tropic of Cancer. Any axis about which an object spins is an imaginary line.
 Mason–Dixon line, which informally marks pieces of the borders of four U.S. states: Delaware, Maryland, Pennsylvania, and West Virginia, once part of Virginia. Symbolically, the line separates the Northern United States from the Southern United States,
 Missouri Compromise Line,
 Time zones.

Science and engineering 
 Line of sight
 Optical ray
 Force lines in mechanical and structural engineering
 Field lines for electric and magnetic fields

See also
 Imaginary line (mathematics)

References

External links and references
 World Geography Glossary

Geography terminology